The hybrid elm cultivar Ulmus × hollandica 'Eleganto-Variegata' is one of a number of cultivars arising from the crossing of the Wych Elm U. glabra with a variety of Field Elm U. minor. It was first mentioned by Miller in The Gardeners Dictionary (1735), as U. major Hollandica, angustis & magis acuminatis sammaris, folio latissimo scabro, eleganter variegato.

Description
The tree was described as the Dutch elm with striped leaves.

Pests and diseases
Ulmus × hollandica 'Major' (if 'Eleganto-Variegata' is a sport of this) is very susceptible to Dutch elm disease.

Cultivation
A conjectured 'Eleganto-Variegata', grafted at 1.5 m., was reported in Stanford Avenue, Brighton, with striped variegation on the lower branch leaves (felled 2009). No specimens are known to survive.

References

Dutch elm cultivar
Ulmus articles missing images
Ulmus
Missing elm cultivars